Pandorea doratoxylon is a species of woody vine in the family Bignoniaceae and is endemic to Australia. The species was first formally described in 1927 by John McConnell Black who gave it the name Tecoma doratoxylon in Transactions and Proceedings of the Royal Society of South Australia. In 1937, Black changed the name to Pandorea doratoxylon.

Plants of the World Online gives the distribution of this species as "New South Wales, Queensland" and the Australian Plant Census as "WA, NT, Qld, NSW" but the name is "not current" in Western Australia and is listed as a synonym of Pandorea pandorana (Andrews) Steenis subsp. pandorana in New South Wales.

Pandorea doratoxylon is an accepted species in the Northern Territory.

References

doratoxylon
Vines
Lamiales of Australia
Flora of New South Wales
Flora of the Northern Territory
Flora of Queensland
Flora of Western Australia
Taxa named by John McConnell Black
Plants described in 1927